The 1986 Soviet football championship was the 55th seasons of competitive football in the Soviet Union. Dinamo Kiev won the Top League championship becoming the Soviet domestic champions for the twelfth time.

Honours

Notes = Number in parentheses is the times that club has won that honour. * indicates new record for competition

Soviet Union football championship

Top League

First League

Second League (finals)

Group 1

Group 2

Group 3

Top goalscorers

Top League
 Aleksandr Borodyuk (Dynamo Moscow) – 21 goals

First League
Vazgen Manasyan (Pamir Dushanbe), Besik Pridonishvili (Guria Lanchkhuti) – 27 goals

References

External links
 1986 Soviet football championship. RSSSF